Adrian Forte is a Jamaican-Canadian celebrity chef and author based in Toronto, Ontario. He was a semi-finalist on Food Network Canada's Top Chef Canada, a judge on Chef in Your Ear, and a contestant on Chopped Canada. He was also featured on Netflix's Restaurants on The Edge as the culinary expert on Caribbean cuisine.

Early life 

Forte was born in Kingston, Jamaica. He moved to New York City in 2003 to live with his grandmother, where he attended high school and played football. He was introduced to the culinary arts by his grandmother who was a former chef in their native country of Jamaica. After her untimely passing, he then moved to Ontario, Canada.

Career 

Forte studied culinary arts at George Brown College in Toronto. Upon graduating, he pursued entrepreneurship and became the executive chef at Gangster Burger and Rock Lobster, one of the co-founders of Dirty Bird Chicken & Waffles and founder of AF1 Caribbean. He is the author of YAWD, A modern Caribbean cookbook, an international private chef and culinary consultant In August 2020, he appeared as a guest chef at Café Boulud at the Four Seasons Hotel, where he featured signature dishes that are now featured in his first cookbook YAWD.

References 

Living people
People from Kingston, Jamaica
Canadian male chefs
Year of birth missing (living people)